The Patliputra Stadium at the Patliputra Sports Complex is a multi-purpose stadium in Kankarbagh, Patna, Bihar. The first Women World Cup Kabaddi Championship was held here in its inaugural year, in which 16 countries had participated. It had also hosted the seven league matches of new Pro Kabaddi League with its home team as Patna Pirates from 7 to 10 August in 2014.

Information

The sports complex was inaugurated on 1 March 2012 with the inauguration of the first Women's World Cup Kabbaddi Championship in India. It was a grand affair in which 16 teams had participated from across the world. All India Federation Cup Wrestling tournament 2012 in March, the 31st National Taekwondo Championship was also held here in this sports complex in December, 2012. The 17th All India Postal Carrom Tournament has also concluded recently at the indoor stadium of the complex.

The Bihar State Sports Authority and the Directorate of Youth Welfare and Sports own the complex and by default, control all the sports activities organised here. The approximate total cost accrued in building the sports complex has been estimated at 19.98 Crore.

Facilities

The Sport Complex is a modern state-of-the-art complex, having facilities for both indoor and outdoor games. It is spread over 16- acre. It has 400-meter athlete track, swimming pool and accommodation facilities for 200 sportsperson. A gymnasium is also on cards. Football, boxing, hockey, kabaddi, table tennis, carrom, swimming, wrestling, Basketball, taekwondo are some of the games organised here.

The sports complex is divided into four wings: Outdoor, Indoor, Coaches and Hostel. The outdoor stadium, Patliputra Stadium, has a capacity of 20,000 spectators whereas the Patliputra Indoor Stadium has a capacity of 3,500 spectators. It is also being used for training or coaches. Its hostel facility comprises separate wing of 227 rooms. The outdoor stadium hosts athletics, football, kabaddi and rugby sevens.

Tournaments 

 Major Tournaments

See also

 Nalanda International Cricket Stadium
 Moin-ul-Haq Stadium
 Kankarbagh
 2012 Women's Kabaddi World Cup

References

Sports venues in Patna
Football venues in Bihar
Multi-purpose stadiums in India
Kabaddi venues in India
Field hockey venues in India
2012 establishments in Bihar
Sports venues completed in 2012
Basketball venues in India